Good luck may refer to:

 Beneficial or desirable luck or fortune
 "Good luck", a parting phrase

People
Goodluck Jonathan, (born 1957), President of Nigeria
Goodluck Nanah Opiah, (born 1964), Nigerian, a politician and Speaker of the Imo State House of Assembly

Film and theatre
 Good Luck (1923 film) original title, (Ost und West), an Austrian film directed by Ivan Abramson and Sidney M. Goldin
 Good Luck (1935 film) (Bonne chance!), a French film directed by Sacha Guitry
 Good Luck (1996 film), a film starring Gregory Hines
 Good Luck (2000 film), an Indian Tamil film starring Prashanth
 Good Luck!, a 2008 Bollywood film
 Good Luck (play), a play by Ian Hay, basis for the 1926 film The Sporting Lover

Music 
 GoodLuck (band), an electro-swing and dance group from Cape Town, South Africa
 Good Luck (band), a pop-punk band from Bloomington, Indiana, US
 Good Luck (album), by Big D and the Kids Table
 Good Luck (AOA EP)
 Good Luck (Beast EP)
 "Good Luck" (AOA song)
 "Good Luck" (Basement Jaxx song)
 "Good Luck" (Bump of Chicken song)
 "Good Luck", a song by Criteria from When We Break
 "Good Luck", a song by Trophy Scars from Bad Luck
 "Good Luck (To You)", a song by The Sinceros from The Sound of Sunbathing

Other uses 
Goodluck, Kentucky
 Good Luck, Maryland, a historical place near Washington, D.C.
 Good Luck!!, a 2003 Japanese TV drama series
 Good Luck (manhwa), a South Korean comic by E-Jin Kang
 Good Luck (football club), a football club of Martinique
 Cordyline fruticosa, also known as good luck plant
 Good Luck (TV series), a 2015 Singaporean TV drama series

See also
 List of lucky symbols
 Luck (disambiguation)
 Lucky (disambiguation)